Ktimenia is a former municipality in Evrytania, Greece. Since the 2011 local government reform it is part of the municipality Karpenisi, of which it is a municipal unit. The municipal unit has an area of 76.824 km2. Population 547 (2011). The seat of the municipality was in Agia Triada.

References

Populated places in Evrytania